The First National Bank in Oregon, Wisconsin is a small Neoclassical-styled bank built in 1914.

History
The First National Bank operated until 1929, closing as a result of the Great Depression. Since then, it has housed a number of other commercial businesses. It was added to the State and the National Register of Historic Places in 2007.

References

Bank buildings on the National Register of Historic Places in Wisconsin
National Register of Historic Places in Dane County, Wisconsin
Defunct banks of the United States
Neoclassical architecture in Wisconsin
Commercial buildings completed in 1914